The cantaro is a percussion instrument. It is a clay pot that is struck in its outer surface or mouth with a hand, creating different effects. Water can be used to pitch the instrument to a desired sound.

In Mexico, particularly in the states of Guerrero and Oaxaca, it is used to accompany chilenas, sones, parabienes, gustos, minuetes, jarabes oaxaqueños, and indigenous dances. The cantaro is also used in the fandangos mixtecos of Puebla.

See also
Udu, a similar musical pot found in Africa

References 
 
 

Mexican musical instruments
Central American and Caribbean percussion instruments
Struck idiophones played by hand
Aerophones